Heil unserm König, Heil! (lit: Hail our king, hail!) was the royal anthem of the Kingdom of Bavaria and the Kingdom of Greece. The song whose lyrics have varied over the decades and which has never been formally declared a national anthem, was one of the numerous German state anthems set to the melody of 'God Save the King' which often began with the same line of lyrics.

Lyrics 
During the reign of Luitpold as a prince regent, there was a variation known as Regentenhymne bezeichnete (The regent's hymn) in which the words "unserm König" were replaced by "dem Regenten (the regent)" in the title and in the first stanza, and also "edler König" in the fourth verse being replaced by "bester Herrscher (greatest ruler)".

1:
Heil unserm König, Heil!
Lang Leben sei sein Teil,
Erhalt’ ihn Gott!
Gerecht und fromm und mild,
Ist er dein Ebenbild,
Ist er dein Ebenbild,
Gott, gieb ihm Glück!

2:
Fest ist des Königs Thron,
Die Wahrheit seine Kron’
Und Recht sein Schwert;
Von Vaterlieb’ erfüllt,
Regiert er gross und mild,
Regiert er gross und mild,
Heil sei ihm! Heil!

3:
O heil’ge Flamme, glüh’,
Glüh und verlösche nie
Fürs Vaterland!
Wir alle stehen dann
Voll Kraft für einen Mann,
Voll Kraft für einen Mann,
Fürs Vaterland.

4:
Sei, edler König, hier
Noch lang’ des Volkes Zier,
Der Menschheit Stolz!
Der hohe Ruhm ist dein,
Der Deinen Lust zu sein,
Der Deinen Lust zu sein.
Heil, Herrscher, dir!

References 

Kingdom of Bavaria
History of modern Greece